The Wuhai Yellow River Road Bridge is located in Wuhai, Inner Mongolia, is the national "75" key construction projects during the period. The bridge was opened to traffic in late 2004. It is the third the Yellow River bridge built in Wuhai is the road bridge in the Yellow River, Inner Mongolia. The bridge construction workers built the bridge by iron and steel, rice harvest, science, and technology development pattern in the western desert region of Inner Mongolia.

Wuhai is located in the southwest of the Inner Mongolia Autonomous Region, East Ordos plateau, west of Alashan prairie, south of Yinchuan near the north of Hetao Plain. The city is located in the north and northwest of the intersection, is the northeast, north China to the northwest of the important transport hub. The completion of the bridge can accelerate the development of the northwest and Wuhai economic development and play an important role.

See also

References

Bridges in China
Bridges over the Yellow River